Loemba is a Congolese surname. Notable people with the surname include:

 André-Raphael Loemba, Congolese politician
 Yannick Loemba (born 1990), Congolese footballer

Surnames of Congolese origin
Kongo-language surnames